Old Salem is an unincorporated community in Monroe County, Alabama, United States.

Notes

Unincorporated communities in Monroe County, Alabama
Unincorporated communities in Alabama